Maryland wine is wine made in the U.S. state of Maryland. The industry has grown rapidly since the first winery in Maryland, Boordy Vineyards, opened in 1945. It is estimated that the industry contributes $50 million annually to the Maryland economy.

History 

The state's history of viticulture begins in 1648 with the earliest recorded instance of winemaking in Maryland. It was not until the 1930s that Philip Wagner, a columnist with the Baltimore Sun, published American Wines and How to Make Them. The book was later revised as Grapes Into Wine and became the definitive book on winemaking in America.

The 1980s proved to be a definitive decade for the industry. In 1981, the Maryland Grape Growers Association was formed, followed by the Maryland Wineries Association in 1984. That same year, the Maryland Wine Festival was held for the first time and the Maryland Winery and Grape Growers Advisory Board was formed.

In 2000, the Maryland State Legislature passed Maryland House Bill 414, allowing state wineries to sell wine by the glass at the winery and to bring product onto retail licensed premises for promotional activities. A record crowd of more than 25,000 attended the Maryland Wine Festival and Maryland wineries sold a record  of wine.

Throughout the years that followed, the industry saw many changes as well as growing success. The instigator of such success was the Maryland Wineries Association's first-ever major cooperative marketing campaign, "Ask For Maryland Wine."

Wine regions
Maryland has four distinct growing regions, allowing for a wide diversity of grape varieties that will thrive throughout the State.

Piedmont Plateau
A majority of the state's vineyards are planted in Central Maryland, from the foothills west of Frederick, Maryland to the head of the Chesapeake Bay.  The state's oldest wineries are located in the Piedmont Plateau as well as the Frederick Wine Trail and Mason-Dixon Wine Trail.  There are clusters of wineries around Westminster and north of Baltimore. Cabernet Sauvignon, Merlot, Cabernet Franc, Chardonnay and Pinot gris are planted, which consists of Harford, Baltimore, Carroll, Howard, Montgomery and Frederick Counties.

Eastern Shore
The Eastern Shore is known for its warm days and cool nights. The soil is sandy and well-drained, and the climate is moderated by the Chesapeake Bay. A wide variety of grapes are growing throughout the Upper Shore (Cecil, Kent and Queen Anne's Counties), Mid Shore (Talbot, Dorchester and Caroline Counties) and Lower Shore (Somerset, Worcester and Wicomico Counties).

Southern plain
Southern Maryland gets hot, and stays hot night and day for most of the summer. This may not be good for some varieties, but many Southern Italian and other Mediterranean varieties are found growing in the region. Barbera, Sangiovese, Montepulciano, Chardonnay, Vidal, Blaufrankisch, Symphony and other varieties are planted in the region, which consists of Anne Arundel, Prince George's, Calvert, Charles and St. Mary's Counties.

Western mountain 
Western Maryland plays host to a number of vineyards and two wineries. Grapes in this region must be more cold-hardy and able to withstand long winters and a short growing season. Varieties such as Cabernet Sauvignon, Cabernet Franc, Petit Verdot, Chardonnay, Norton/Cynthiana, Chambourcin, Vidal and Seyval are found in the region. The region consists of Washington, Allegany and Garrett Counties.

Prominent figures 
Phillip M. Wagner is still considered a very prominent figure for those in the amateur and commercial sides of wine making.
Wagner is the author of Grapes into Wine and several other books having to do specifically with North American wine making. Including several revisions of his original book "American Wines and How to Make Them" originally published in 1933. He was also the founder of Maryland's own Boordy Vineyards where he experimented with various wine making techniques most notably hybridization of grapes.
	Wagner's literary career includes serving as the editor of the Baltimore Sun newspaper and writing a biography of fellow Sun editor, H.L. Mencken. He died December 29, 1996.

Maryland Wine Festival
The Maryland Wine Festival is a wine festival that showcases Maryland wine on the third weekend of September annually. The festival was established in 1984 in Union Mills, Maryland and has been held at the Carroll County Farm Museum in Westminster, Maryland since 1985. It is one of the oldest and largest wine festivals on the East Coast, hosting over 25,000 people and featuring more than 200 wines for sampling each year.

Wine Industry 
A growing number of for-profit and non-profit organizations have been established since the 1980s to help promote Maryland Wine. Two of the more well known organizations are the Maryland Grape Growers Association and the Maryland Wineries Association. The number of vineyards and wineries in Maryland grow each year. As of 2019 there are over 80 registered vineyards and wineries in the state.

See also
American wine

References

External links 
 Maryland Wineries Association
 Maryland Grape Growers Association

 
Wine regions of the United States by state